Kybartai is a city in Marijampolė County, Lithuania.

History 
Kybartai was founded under the reign of Sigismund I the Old by the colonization efforts of his wife, Bona Sforza. 
In 1561, it was listed in the land-register of Jurbarkas and Virbalis.

When in 1861 a branch of the Saint Petersburg–Warsaw Railway was built from Vilnius to the Prussian border, where it was linked to the Prussian Eastern Railway, the Russian border station near the village of Kybartai was named after the neighbouring town of Verzhbolovo (Вержболово), Lithuanian Virbalis, German Wirballen. Meanwhile, Kybartai has become a town bigger than Virbalis and the now Lithuanian border station is called Kybartai, too. The German station of the Prussian Eastern Railway on the western side of the frontier was Eydtkuhnen, today it is the Russian border station and called Chernyshevskoye (Чернышевское).

On June 30, 1941, an Einsatzgruppe of Germans and a few Lithuanian policemen perpetrated a mass execution of the local Jewish population. 106–116 men were murdered in a sand quarry.

From July to Autumn 1941, other Jews from the town were assassinated with hundreds of victims from the nearby town of Virbalis on another execution site.

People born in Kybartai 
 the Russian landscape painter Isaac Ilyich Levitan (Russian language: Исаак Ильич Левитан, 1860–1900)
 the Polish composer Emil Młynarski (1870–1935)
 the Lithuanian painter Jacob Mesenblum (1895–1933)
 the Austrian singer Harald Serafin (born 1931)
 the Lithuanian singer and politician Inga Valinskienė (born 1966)

References

 
Cities in Lithuania
Cities in Marijampolė County
Suwałki Governorate
Shtetls
Holocaust locations in Lithuania
Populated places established in the 16th century